A Massachusetts general election was held on November 4, 1986 in the Commonwealth of Massachusetts.

The election included:
 statewide elections for governor, lieutenant governor, attorney general, Secretary of the Commonwealth, treasurer, and auditor;
 district elections for U.S. Representatives, State Representatives, State Senators, and Governor's Councillors; and
 ballot questions at the state and local levels.

Democratic and Republican candidates were selected in party primaries held September 16, 1986.

Governor & Lieutenant Governor

Democrats Michael Dukakis and Evelyn Murphy were elected Governor and Lieutenant Governor, respectively, over Republican candidates George Kariotis and Nicholas Nikitas. Dukakis' victory made him the longest-serving governor in the history of Massachusetts.

Attorney General

Democrat James Shannon was elected attorney general. He defeated former assistant attorney general Joann Shotwell in the Democratic primary and U.S. Attorney Edward Francis Harrington in the general election.

Democratic primary

Candidates
James Shannon, former U.S. Representative from Lowell and candidate for U.S. Senate in 1984
Joann Shotwell, former Assistant Attorney General

Results

General election

Candidates
Edward Francis Harrington, former Democratic U.S. Attorney for the District of Massachusetts (Republican)
James Shannon, former U.S. Representative from Lowell and candidate for U.S. Senate in 1984 (Democratic)

Results

Secretary of the Commonwealth

Incumbent Secretary of the Commonwealth Michael J. Connolly defeated former State Representative Deborah R. Cochran in the general election.

General election

Candidates
Deborah R. Cochran, former State Representative from Dedham (Republican)
Michael J. Connolly, incumbent Secretary of the Commonwealth (Democratic)

Results

Treasurer and Receiver-General

Incumbent Treasurer and Receiver-General Robert Q. Crane defeated Republican L. Joyce Hampers in the general election.

General election

Candidates
Robert Q. Crane, incumbent Treasurer since 1964 (Democratic)
L. Joyce Hampers (Republican)

Results

Auditor

Incumbent Auditor John J. Finnegan did not run for reelection. Democrat A. Joseph DeNucci defeated Boston City Councilors Maura Hennigan and Charles Yancey in the Democratic primary and House Minority Leader William G. Robinson in the general election.

Democratic primary

Candidates
A. Joseph DeNucci, State Representative from Newton and former professional boxer
Maura Hennigan, member of the Boston City Council at-large
Charles Yancey, member of the Boston City Council

Results

Republican primary

Candidates
William G. Robinson, State Representative from Melrose and Minority Leader of the House of Representatives
Andrew Natsios, State Representative from Holliston and chairman of the Massachusetts Republican Party

Results

General election

Ballot questions

Question 1
Proposed Legislative Amendment to the Constitution - The proposed constitutional amendment would allow the legislature to prohibit or regulate abortions to the extent permitted by the United States Constitution. It would also provide that the state constitution does not require public or private funding of abortions, or the provision of services of facilities for performing abortions, beyond what is required by the United States Constitution. The provisions of this amendment would not apply to abortions required to prevent the death of the mother.

Question 2
Proposed Legislative Amendment to the Constitution - The proposed constitutional amendment would allow the expenditure of public funds for private schools and private school students.

Question 3
Law Proposed by Initiative Petition - The proposed law would reduced then repeal the 7% surtax on Massachusetts state income taxes and would limit state tax revenue growth to the level of growth in the total wages and salaries of the citizens of the state.

Question 4
Law Proposed by Initiative Petition - The proposed law would require that the State Department of Environmental Quality Engineering (DEQE) to search for sites in the Commonwealth where oil or hazardous materials have been disposed of and take all steps necessary to clean up those sites within specified time limits. Provisions are made for informing the public about sites in their communities.

Question 5
Referendum on an Existing Law - The law requires all drivers and passengers to wear properly adjusted and fastened safety belts while traveling in motor vehicles on public ways.

Question 6
Law Proposed by Initiative Petition - The proposed law would provide a system of voter registration by mail applicable to all qualified voters and would eliminate statutory provisions permitting certain persons to vote only for presidential electors.

References

External links
 

 
Massachusetts